Bantam Books is an American publishing house owned entirely by parent company Random House, a subsidiary of Penguin Random House; it is an imprint of the Random House Publishing Group. It was formed in 1945 by Walter B. Pitkin, Jr., Sidney B. Kramer, and Ian and Betty Ballantine, with funding from Grosset & Dunlap and Curtis Publishing Company. It has since been purchased several times by companies including National General, Carl Lindner's American Financial and, most recently, Bertelsmann; it became part of Random House in 1998, when Bertelsmann purchased it to form Bantam Doubleday Dell. It began as a mass market publisher, mostly of reprints of hardcover books, with some original paperbacks as well. It expanded into both trade paperback and hardcover books, including original works, often reprinted in house as mass-market editions.

History
The company was failing when Oscar Dystel, who had previously worked at Esquire and as editor on Coronet magazine was hired in 1954 to manage it. By the end of the next year the company was profitable. Dystel retired as chairman in 1980. By that time Bantam was the largest publisher of paperbacks, had over 15% of the market, and exceeded 100 million in sales.

In 1964, Grosset & Dunlap acquired full ownership of Bantam from Curtis. In 1968, Grosset & Dunlap was acquired by conglomerate National General, run by Gene Klein. National General was acquired by American Financial Group in 1973. American Financial sold Bantam to the Italian firm IFI in 1974. Bertelsmann acquired half of Bantam in 1977 and assumed full ownership in 1980. IN 1986, Bantam began publishing audiobooks. In 1986, Bertelsmann acquired Doubleday & Company and created the holding Bantam Doubleday Dell. In 1998, Bertelsmann acquired Random House from Advance Publications; Random House became the name of the holding company. After the merger, Bantam was merged with Dell Publishing. Bantam Dell became part of the Random House publishing group in 2008. Ballantine Books was merged with Bantam Dell in 2010. In 2013, Random House merged with Penguin to form Penguin Random House.

Books published
Bantam has published the entire original run of the "Choose Your Own Adventure" series of children's books, as well as the first original novels based upon the Star Trek franchise, publishing about a dozen such books between 1970 and 1982, when the license was taken over by Pocket Books. Bantam also published a dozen volumes of short story adaptations of scripts from Star Trek: The Original Series. Bantam was the former American paperback publisher of The Guinness Book of Records. Another series was "Bantam War Book" from the 1970s to the 90s, with the majority of books from World War II, but also from Vietnam, Korea and other conflicts.

Other series include Bantam Classics, the Bantam Spectra science fiction imprint, the juvenile Skylark imprint, and editions of Shakespeare.

Bantam Classics
The series was started in 1958. It reprints mostly public domain, unabridged classic books, intended to increase backlist sales and reintroduce the works to new audiences. More than a hundred books have been released in the series.

Like competing editions, some Bantam Classics are printed with an introduction from a literary critic, and in the case of Moby Dick, with a selection of critical essays on the novel appended as well.

Authors
Authors originally published exclusively or significantly by Bantam include:

 Maya Angelou
 Isaac Asimov
 Jean Auel
 Louis L'Amour
 Ray Bradbury
 Ernest Callenbach
 Alan Campbell
 Philip K. Dick
 S. S. Van Dine
 James Dobson
 Stephen R. Donaldson

 Ian Fleming
 Frederick Forsyth
 Lisa Gardner
 Richard Dawkins
 David Gemmell
 Elizabeth George
 William Gibson
 John Glenn
 Daniel Goleman
 Graham Greene
 John Grisham
 Laurell K. Hamilton

 Thomas Harris
 Stephen Hawking
 Mo Hayder
 Hermann Hesse
 Tracy Hickman
 Tami Hoag
 Robin Hobb
 Kay Hooper
 Iris Johansen
 Shmuel Katz

 Dean Koontz
 Emilie Loring
 Lois Lowry
 Robert Ludlum
 Duncan Lunan
 William March
 George R. R. Martin
 Malachi Martin
 Anne McCaffrey
 Andy McDermott

 Terence McKenna
 Farley Mowat
 Joseph Murphy
 Michael Palmer
 Robert M. Pirsig
 Daniel Quinn
 Tom Robbins
 Jane Roberts
 Alan Rodgers
 J.D. Salinger
 Alice Schroeder

 H. Norman Schwarzkopf
 Jerry Seinfeld
 Adam Smith
 Lori Nelson Spielman
 John Steinbeck
 Danielle Steel
 Neal Stephenson
 Bruce Sterling
 Rex Stout
 William Tenn
 Margaret Weis
 Elie Wiesel
 Victor Villasenor

Books originally published by Bantam

See also

 Rafael Palacios, early book jacket artist at Bantam

References

External links

Book publishing companies based in New York (state)
Publishing companies based in New York City
Publishing companies established in 1945
1945 establishments in New York (state)
Random House